The Pennsylvania Attorney General election of 2012 was held on November 6, 2012. The primary election was held on April 24.

Candidates
David Freed, the district attorney of Cumberland County, ran unopposed in the Republican primary. Kathleen Kane, a former assistant district attorney in Lackawanna County faced former U.S. Representative Patrick Murphy in the primary to become the Democratic nominee. Kane was victorious in this race by a margin of 52.8% to 47.2% Marakay Rogers was the Libertarian candidate.

Results
On November 6, 2012, Kathleen Kane defeated David Freed and Marakay Rogers to be elected Attorney General of Pennsylvania. She was the first Democrat elected to the office ever since it became an elected position in 1980.

References

Attorney General
Pennsylvania Attorney General elections
Pennsylvania